Morz or Mörz may refer to:

Michael Mörz (born 1980), an Austrian footballer
Morz, Fars, a village in Fars province, Iran